The Alipurduar–Bamanhat branch line is an Indian railway line connecting  with . This  track is under the jurisdiction of Northeast Frontier Railway.

History

Cooch Behar State Railway 
The Cooch Behar State Railway (CBSR) was a  narrow gauge railway line that was built between Jayanti in the current Alipurduar district of West Bengal, India to Lalmonirhat in the current Lalmonirhat district in Bangladesh before partition between 1893 and 1898. The line originated from Jayanti near the foothills of Eastern Himalayas and went via Alipurduar, Cooch Behar, Dinhata and Gitaldaha to finally join the narrow-gauge track of Kaunia–Dharlla State Railway at Mogalhat. This line was later brought by Eastern Bengal Railway in 1899.

Eastern Bengal Railway 
The Kaunia–Dharlla State Railway was constructed as a narrow-gauge line from Teesta railway junction to Mogalhat on 1882 by Eastern Bengal Railway. This metre-gauge line was further extended to Amingaon via Fakiragram & Kokrajhar on 1906. The Jayanti–Gitaldaha junction section was converted to metre gauge on 1910.

Post Partition 
With the partition of India on 1947, the Assam links to Bengal were snapped. Further the Gitaldaha–Mogalhat rail transit point became defunct as the railway bridge over Dharla River was washed away in floods. The  Alipurduar–Bamanhat section and  Fakiragram-Golakganj sections were cut off as well and became isolated metre gauge sections. As a part of the Assam Link project a  line was constructed between Kishanganj and Fakiragram in 1948. Thus these 2 sections became branch lines. Fakiragram was connected with a new  line via Boxirhat to New Coochbehar in 2010-12.

Gauge conversion
The Alipurduar–Bamanhat branch line was converted from metre gauge to broad gauge and was reopened to public on 2007. A new station called the New Gitaldaha station was built to be used instead of the old Gitaldaha junction. The  Fakiragram–Golakganj–Dhubri section was converted from metre gauge to broad gauge during 2010. Golakgunj was linked with New Cooch Behar with a new line on 2012 as a part of the New Maynaguri-Jogighopa project.

References

|

5 ft 6 in gauge railways in India
Rail transport in West Bengal
Alipurduar railway division